Super Caesars Palace is a Super Nintendo Entertainment System casino video game centered on Caesars Palace in Las Vegas, Nevada. It is the follow-up to Virgin's previous Caesars Palace game. Super Caesars Palace was also released for the Sega Genesis and Game Gear as Caesars Palace. The Japanese version of the game was followed by a sequel, Super Casino 2.

Gameplay

The objective is to win money at a casino. The player begins with $2000. Games include blackjack, slot machines, roulette, horse racing, Keno, video poker, and Red Dog. The player can talk to non-player characters (a feature omitted in the Japanese version), who may offer advice and clues on how to live the casino lifestyle. The game also offers $100 scratch-off tickets that players can keep scratching to try to win more money. However, if a picture of a bomb is uncovered, the ticket is void and all winnings are nullified.

After playing, the player leaves in a limo, a Greyhound bus or a taxi. If the player plays too slowly, a warning pops up on the screen and if it is unheeded, the player is forced to do a certain action. When the player finally leaves the casino using the available transportation, the credits appear as road signs along the desert highway and the player has to restart the game.

Reception
AllGame gave the game a rating of 2.5 out of 5 stars in their overview. Video Games & Computer Entertainment gave the game a 60% rating in their March 1994 review. Game Informer magazine rated it an 8 out of 10 in their April 2000 review.

References

1993 video games
Caesars Palace video games
Casino video games
Coconuts Japan games
Majesco Entertainment games
Game Gear games
Sega Genesis games
Super Nintendo Entertainment System games
Super Casino series
Video game sequels
Video games scored by Matt Furniss
Video games scored by Tommy Tallarico
Video games developed in the United States
Video games set in Nevada
Video games set in the Las Vegas Valley
Virgin Interactive games